Colwyn Bay Football Club is a football club based in Old Colwyn in north Wales. They are currently members of the Cymru North, the second tier of the Welsh football pyramid. Nicknamed the Seagulls, but also known as 'The Bay', their home ground is Llanelian Road in Old Colwyn.

History
The club played its first match in January 1881 and joined the North Wales Coast League in 1898. The club were forced to resign from the league during the 1900–01 when they could not find a home ground to play at, with their fixtures taken over by Penmaenmawr Royal Welch Fusiliers. However, they returned to the league the following season. From 1907, the club became known as Colwyn Bay United. After the league folded in 1921, they joined the Welsh National League. In 1927–28 the club finished as runners-up in the league and won the League Cup. They won the cup for a second time in 1929–30, also reaching the semi-finals of the Welsh Cup, in which they lost 3–1 to Rhyl Athletic. The league folded at the end of the season and the club were subsequently founder members of the North Wales Football Combination, which they went on to win in its first season. Following their title, the club joined the Birmingham & District League. However, the team struggled in the new league, and after finishing bottom in 1935–36 and 1936–37, they switched to the Welsh National League (North).

Colwyn Bay finished as Welsh League (North) runners-up in 1945–46, the first season after World War II. They were runners-up again in 1963–64, and were champions the following season. The early 1980s saw the club enter a period of success, as they were champions for a second time in 1980–81. In 1982–83 the club won the league and reached the Welsh Cup semi-finals, losing 4–0 on aggregate to Swansea City.

After retaining the league title in 1983–84, the club returned to the English football league system, joining Division Three of the North West Counties League. They finished as runners-up in their first season in the league and were promoted to Division Two. A fourth-place finish in Division Two 1986–87 saw the club promoted to Division One. In 1987–88 the club reached the first round of the FA Cup for the first time, losing 1–0 at Northwich Victoria. The following season saw the club win the League Cup, beating Warrington Town 3–0 in the final at Gigg Lane. After finishing as Premier Division runners-up in 1990–91, they were promoted to Division One of the Northern Premier League, filling the vacancy created by South Liverpool folding. They won the division at the first attempt and were promoted to the Premier Division. The season also saw them win the North Wales Coast Challenge Cup and reach the Welsh Cup semi-finals for a third time, losing 4–2 to Hednesford Town.

However, at the end of the 1991–92 season, a dispute with the Football Association of Wales led to Colwyn Bay being ordered to join the newly-formed League of Wales or cease playing in Wales. As a result, the club started the new season playing at the Drill Field in Northwich, before moving to Ellesmere Port Stadium in Ellesmere Port. A court injunction allowed the club to return to playing home matches in Colwyn Bay in 1994 before the case was won in the High Court of Justice in April 1995. 
In 1995–96 they reached the first round of the FA Cup again; after beating Spennymoor United 1–0 in the first round, they lost 2–0 at Blackpool in the second round. They qualified for the first round again the following season, eventually losing 2–0 to fellow north Wales club Wrexham in a replay. Another first round appearance in 1997–98 resulted in a 2–0 defeat at Notts County.

The club remained in the Northern Premier League's Premier Division until the end of the 2002–03 season, when they were relegated to Division One. In 2006–07 a fifth-place finish saw the club qualify for the promotion play-offs, in which they lost 3–2 to Cammell Laird in the semi-finals. League restructuring led to the club being placed in Division One South for the 2007–08 season, before being switched to the North division the following season. Their first season in Division One North resulted in a fourth-place finish and another play-off campaign, in which they lost their semi-final match 4–2 on penalties to Newcastle Blue Star after a 2–2 draw. However, after finishing fourth again in 2009–10, the club were promoted back to the Premier Division via the play-offs, beating Curzon Ashton 2–1 in the semi-finals and then winning 1–0 against Lancaster City in the final.

The 2010–11 season saw Colwyn Bay finish as Premier Division runners-up. In the subsequent play-offs they beat North Ferriby United 2–1 in the semi-finals and then defeated FC United 1–0 in the final to earn promotion to the Conference North. After four seasons in the Conference North, the club were relegated back to the Northern Premier League's Premier Division at the end of the 2014–15 season. They were relegated again in 2015–16, returning to Division One North. In March 2019 the club opted to rejoin the Welsh football system for the 2019–20 season, and joined the newly formed second-tier Cymru North.

Ground

The club had a nomadic existence during their early years, often having to move as builders acquired land as the town rapidly expanded during the late 19th and early 20th century. They played on land owned by Penrhos School, at the Board School field, at Marine Hotel field and then Eirias Park. After the adjacent school expanded onto the land, they played on a pitch in Mochdre before relocating to another ground at Eirias Park towards the end of the 1940s. This remained home until 1983, when the land was required to dump soil following construction of the A55. Eirias Arena was a temporary home for a season and a half until the club moved to their current Llanelian Road ground in 1984. The Shed End stand was erected in 1985 and two more stands built by 1990, when floodlights were installed and inaugurated with a friendly match against Liverpool. When the club was forced to play outside Wales in 1992, they initially played at Northwich Victoria's Drill Field, before moving to Ellesmere Port.

After returning to Llanelian Road in 1994, terracing was installed on the Llanelian Road side of the ground in 1998. Following promotion to the Conference North, a new covered 500-seat stand was built during the 2011–12 season. The ground currently has a capacity of 3,000, of which 500 is seated. In September 2022 the club submitted plans for a new 1,000-seat stand to replace two covered terraced stands on the west side of the ground. Permission was granted by Conwy County Borough Council in October 2022.

Current squad
As of 21 January 2023

Out on loan

Management team

Honours
Northern Premier League
Division One champions 1991–92
Division One League Cup 1991-92
North West Counties League
League Cup winners 1988–89
 League Cup runners-up 1987-88
Floodlit Trophy winners 1990-91
Welsh League (North)
Champions 1964–65, 1980–81, 1982–83, 1983–84
North Wales Football Combination
Champions 1930–31
Welsh National League
League Cup winners 1927–28
 North Wales Coast Challenge Cup
Winners 1930-31, 1960-61 (Shared), 1981–82, 1982–83, 1983–84, 1991–92, 1995–96, 1997–98, 1999-00, 2010–11
Alves Cup
Winners 1963-64
Cookson Cup
Winners 1973-74, 1979–80, 1980–81, 1981–82, 1983–84
Barrit Cup
Winners 1979-80, 1983–84

Records
Best FA Cup performance: Second round, 1995–96
Best Welsh Cup performance: Semi-finals: 1929–30, 1982–83, 1991–92, 2021–22
Best FA Trophy performance: Quarter-finals, 1996–97
Record attendance: 5,000 vs Borough United, 1964 (at Eirias Park)
Most appearances: Bryn Jones
Most goals: Peter Donnelly

See also
Colwyn Bay F.C. players
Colwyn Bay F.C. managers

References

Sources

External links

Official website

 
Football clubs in Wales
Welsh football clubs in English leagues
Association football clubs established in 1881
1881 establishments in Wales
West Midlands (Regional) League
North West Counties Football League clubs
Northern Premier League clubs
National League (English football) clubs
Cymru North clubs
Sport in Conwy County Borough
Welsh League North clubs
North Wales Coast League clubs
Colwyn Bay